= Tagaytay City Science National High School–Integrated Senior High School =

Public high school in Cavite, Philippines

Location
- Tagaytay, Cavite, Philippines
- Coordinates: 14°07′29″N 120°59′32″E

Information
- Type: Secondary Public Science High School
- Established: June 1957
- Grades: 7 to 12

The Tagaytay City Science National High School–Integrated Senior High School (Filipino: Mataas na Paaralang Pambansa na Pang-Agham ng Lungsod ng Tagaytay) is a public science high school in Tagaytay, Cavite, Philippines.
